The 2019 Liberian First Division League is the 45th season of the Liberian First Division League (formerly the Liberian Premier League), the top-tier football league in Liberia, since the league's establishment in 1956. The season started on 27 February 2019.

Standings

References

Football competitions in Liberia
2018–19 in African association football leagues
2019 in Liberian sport